Qasim Al-Malak Iraqi actor Born in Basra in 1946. he presented well-established comedic characters such as the role of (Rajab) in the series (The Wolf and the Eyes of the city), He is one of the knights of Iraqi cinema most involved in its films that swept theaters and achieved huge revenues in the Iraqi cinema box office at that time.

His contributions to Iraqi cinema 

 The head movie directed by Faisal Al Yasiri 1976
 The Big Question 1979 movie
 A Bride but, directed by Hussein Amin
 Faeq Marries Directed by Ibrahim Abdel Jalil 1984
 Love in Baghdad with Iqbal Naim
 The Flaming Borders directed by Faisal Al-Yasiri 1986
 Building 13 directed by Sahib Haddad 1988
 Assume Yourself Happy Directed by Abdul Hadi Al-Rawi
 Six on Six - Directed by Khairiya Al-Mansour
 One Hundred Percent - Directed by Khairiya Al-Mansour
 King Ghazi Directed by Muhammad Shukri Jamil 1992

As actor 

 Muhammad bin al-Qasim al-Thaqafi series
 The Jurf Al-Malah series directed by Ibrahim Abdel-Jalil
 The Wolf and Eyes of the City series, written by Adel Kazem, directed by Ibrahim Abdel Jalil
 The Eagle and Eyes of the City series, written by Adel Kazem, directed by Ibrahim Abdel Jalil
 Rebel series
 Adel gets married series
 The first and second parts of the series Love and War Part 1, directed by Jamal Abdel Jassim
 The Next Destiny series directed by Azzam Saleh
 Coffee aroma series
 Dar Dour series directed by Jamal Abed Jassim
 The Saeq Al-Souta series directed by Jamal Abed Jassem
 The first lesson series directed by Jamal Abed Jassim
 Al-Titi series, collecting the train, directed by Jamal Abed Jassim
 Me and the Majnun series directed by Jamal Abed Jassim
 The series Al-Ardah Al-Halji, written by Qassem Al-Malak, directed by Jamal Abed Jassim
 The series (One + One) (directed by Jamal Abed Jassim)
 The First Lie series, directed by Hassan Hosni

In theater 

 Al-Dukhana 1967 with Wajih Abdel-Ghani and Qaid Al-Nomani
 The Kingdom of Beggars 1986, starring Qassem Al Malak, Rasim Al Jumaily
 A Journey Around the World Qasim Al Malak Millions 1996

Administrative Positions 

 Drama Director - Al-Baghdadiya Channel
 Director of the National Acting Troupe for ten years
 Theater manager
 Director of the National Folklore Troupe

References 

1946 births
Living people